Dawn Rae (born 4 January 1941 in Fitzroy North, Melbourne, Victoria) is an Australian former cricket player. Rae played one Test and four One Day Internationals for the Australia women's national cricket team.

Grandmother of inaugural Melbourne Cup Carnival Country Series final winning horse trainer Alexander Rae.

References

External links
 Dawn Rae at CricketArchive
 Dawn Rae at southernstars.org.au

Living people
1941 births
Australia women Test cricketers
Australia women One Day International cricketers